Shilo is a compilation album of songs recorded by Neil Diamond, which was released on September 12, 1970 by Bang Records. Bang released a remixed version of "Shilo" in 1970 which became a hit and inspired this compilation of songs Diamond recorded for Bang in 1966 and 1967 before moving to Uni Records.  It reached number 52 on the U.S. pop albums chart, and was the best-selling of his Bang albums.

Track listing 
Unless otherwise indicated, all songs composed by Neil Diamond.

References

1970 compilation albums
Neil Diamond compilation albums
Bang Records compilation albums
Albums produced by Jeff Barry
Albums produced by Ellie Greenwich